The 61st Air Base Wing is an inactive wing of the United States Air Force, last stationed at Los Angeles Air Force Base, El Segundo, California. The 61st was the host unit at Los Angeles Air Force Base, and commanded all the Air Force support groups and units assigned to the base. When active. the wing is entitled to temporary bestowal of the history and honors stems of the 61st Troop Carrier Group.

Its mission was to provide base operating support to Los Angeles Air Force Base customers.

History
The wing was first activated as the 61st Troop Carrier Wing by the United States Air Forces in Europe in 1948 to control C-47 Skytrain and C-54 Skymaster units.   The wing was the host organization at Rhein-Main Air Base, West Germany.  It also operated Tempelhof Air Base, in Occupied Berlin  until 5 November 1948 and Tulln Air Base in the American Occupation Zone of Austria until 10 December 1948.

Its initial mission was to coordinate Berlin Airlift operations for USAFE in conjunction with units deployed from the United States and the Royal Air Force.   With the end of Berlin Airlift operations in 1949, flew theater airlift missions within USAFE and participated in numerous exercises.   With the outbreak of the Korean War in June 1950, wing deployed its operational component, the 61st Troop Carrier Group to Ashiya Air Base, Japan on 21 July 1950 to reinforce Far East Air Forces transport units and perform combat transport operations within South Korea and Japan.  With the group deployed to Japan, the wing was inactivated in West Germany in June 1951.

The wing was reactivated as the 61st Military Airlift Wing at Hickam Air Force Base, Hawaii in 1966 under Military Airlift Command, replacing the discontinued Military Air Transport Service 1502d Air Transport Wing in January 1966. It "provided air transport and support functions for airlift operations in the entire Pacific Ocean area, Alaska to Antarctica, and the United States to Southeast Asia. Supported airlift, primarily in support of United States military forces in Southeast Asia during the Vietnam War.   The Hickam Aerial Port was a primary destination for United States military personnel on Rest and Recreation leave from South Vietnam during the Vietnam War, the 61st MAW operating the aerial port and coordinating flights by civilian contract airlines to and from bases in South Vietnam.

The wing's assigned airlift squadrons were inactivated in 1968 and 1969, after which became the 61st Military Airlift Support Wing for Military Airlift Command flights within Pacific Air Forces as well as Naval and Marine Transports supporting their respective organizations in Hawaii.   Inactivated 1 April 1980 and is equipment and most personnel being reassigned to the 834th Airlift Division.

On 1 August 2006, it was reactivated as the 61st Air Base Wing, a non-flying unit at Los Angeles Air Force Base under Air Force Space Command.  It supported the Space and Missile Systems Center from 2006 to 2010, when it was inactivated and base support assigned to the 61st Air Base Group.

Lineage
 Established as the 61st Troop Carrier Wing, Medium and activated on 1 July 1948
 Redesignated 61st Troop Carrier Wing, Heavy on 15 August 1948
 Inactivated on 2 June 1951
 Redesignated 61st Military Airlift Wing and activated on 27 December 1965 (not organized)
 Organized on 8 January 1966
 Redesignated 61st Military Airlift Support Wing on 22 December 1969
 Inactivated 1 April 1980
 Redesignated 61st Air Base Wing on 20 June 2006
 Activated on 1 August 2006
 Inactivated on 30 July 2010

Assignments
 United States Air Forces in Europe, 1 July 1948
 Attached to: Berlin Airlift Task Force until 29 July 1948
 Attached to: Airlift Task Force (Provisional), 22 July - 4 November 1948
 Attached to: 1st Air Lift Task Force, 5 November 1948 – 9 July 1949
 1st Air Lift Task Force, 10 July 1949
 United States Air Forces in Europe, 26 September 1949
 Twelfth Air Force, 21 January-2 June 1951
 Military Air Transport Service, 27 December 1965 (not organized)
 Twenty-Second Air Force, 8 January 1966 – 1 April 1980
 Space and Missile Systems Center, 1 August 2006 - 30 July 2010

Components
Groups
 60th Troop Carrier Group: attached 26 September 1949 – 2 June 1951
 61st Air Base Group: 1 July 1948 - 2 June 1951
 61st Maintenance & Supply Group: 1 July 1948 – 2 June 1951
 61st Station Medical Group (later 61st Medical Group): 1 July 1948 – 2 June 1951, 1 August 2006 – 30 July 2010
 61st Troop Carrier Group (later 61st Military Airlift Group, 61st Air Base Group, 61st Mission Support Group): 1 July 1948 – 1 January 1951 (attached to 1st Airlift Task Force 5 November 1948, Airlift Wing (Provisional) 20 November 1948, 7497th Airlift Wing 10 January 1949 – 9 July 1949, Military Air Transport Service 21 July 1950, North Pacific Wing (Provisional) 26 July 1950, 1705th Air Transport Wing 24 August 1950, Far East Air Force Combat Cargo Command (Provisional) 10 December 1950 – 1 January 1951); 1 August 2006 – 30 July 2010
 65th Military Airlift Group (later 65th Military Airlift Support Group): 8 January 1966 – 1 January 1972
 513th Troop Carrier Group: attached 10 July - 16 October 1949
 1422d Air Transport Group, Provisional: attached 2 August - 5 November 1948
 7350th Air Base Group: 1 July 1948 – 5 November 1948
 Tempelhof Central Airport, Berlin
 7360th Air Base Group: 1 July 1948 – 10 December 1948
 Tulln Air Base, Austria
 C-54 Troop Carrier Group, Provisional: attached 1 July - 2 August 1948

Squadrons
 6th Military Airlift Squadron: 8 January 1966 – 8 June 1968 (not operational after 16 May 1968)
 50th Military Airlift Squadron: 8 January 1966 – 22 December 1969 (not operational after 1 December 1969)
 6th Aerial Port Squadron: 1 March 1975 – 1 June 1975
 61st Aerial Port Squadron: 8 January 1966 – 22 December 1969
 602d Military Airlift Support Squadron: 8 January 1966 – 1 November 1975
 Elmendorf Air Force Base, Alaska
 603d Military Airlift Support Squadron: 8 January 1966 – 8 July 1966, 1 January 1972 – 1 April 1980
 Kadena Air Base, Okinawa
 604th Military Airlift Support Squadron: 8 January 1966 – 8 July 1966, 1 January 1972 – 1 June 1975
 Clark Air Base, Philippines
 605th Military Airlift Support Squadron: 8 January 1966 – 8 July 1966, 1 August 1972 – 1 April 1980
 Andersen Air Force Base, Guam
 606th Military Airlift Support Squadron: 8 January 1966 – 8 July 1966
 Mactan Island Airfield, Philippines
 607th Military Airlift Support Squadron: 8 January 1966 – 1 October 1980
 Naval Air Facility Midway
 608th Military Airlift Support Squadron: 8 January 1966 – 8 July 1966, 1 January 1972 – 30 April 1972
 Cam Ranh Air Base, South Vietnam
 610th Military Airlift Support Squadron: 1 January 1972 – 1 October 1978
 Yokota Air Base, Japan
 611th Military Airlift Support Squadron: 1 January 1972 – 1 October 1978
 Osan Air Base, South Korea
 616th Military Airlift Support Squadron: 8 January 1966 – 8 July 1966, 1 January 1972 – 26 March 1973
 Tan Son Nhut Air Base, South Vietnam
 Detachment 1 Phu Cat Air Base, South Vietnam
 Detachment 2 Bien Hoa Air Base, South Vietnam
 617th Military Airlift Support Squadron: 8 January 1966 – 8 July 1966, 1 January 1972 – 1 October 1972
 Da Nang Air Base, South Vietnam
 Detachment 1 Pleiku Air Base, South Vietnam
 618th Military Airlift Support Squadron: 1 January 1972 – 1 June 1975
 U-Tapao Royal Thai Navy Airfield, Thailand
 619th Military Airlift Support Squadron: 22 December 1969 – 30 April 1972
Det D, later Det 2, Christchurch International Airport, New Zealand

Military Airlift Support Squadrons were support units that had no aircraft of its own, but rather supported the forward operations of aircraft from other MAC units, principally from the CONUS. Furthermore, the support squadron was a consolidation of all the operations and maintenance functions that state-side airlift wings had organized as separate units.

Stations
 Rhein-Main Air Force Base (later Rhein-Main Air Base), Germany (later West Germany), 1 July 1948 – 2 June 1951
 Hickam Air Force Base, Hawaii, 8 January 1966 – 1 April 1980
 Los Angeles Air Force Base, California, 1 August 2006 – 30 July 2010

Aircraft
 Primarily C-47, 1948,  C-54, 1948, 1949–1950; and C-82, 1949–1951; but also flew (in single or small numbers) B-17, 1948–1949
 C-47 Skytrain, 1949–1951
 C-119 Flying Boxcar, August 1950
 C-54 Skymaster, 1951
 C-121 Constellation, 1966
 C-124 Globemaster II, 1966–1969

References

Notes

Bibliography

External links
 A History and Memory of the 610th Military Airlift Support Squadron (610 MASS)
 Los Angeles Air Force Base Home Page

0061
Military units and formations established in 2006
Military units and formations in California